The 2002 New Hampshire 300 was the 27th stock car race of the 2002 NASCAR Winston Cup Series and the sixth iteration of the event. The race was held on Sunday, September 15, 2002, in Loudon, New Hampshire, at New Hampshire International Speedway, a  permanent, oval-shaped, low-banked racetrack. The race was shortened from its scheduled 300 laps to 207 due to darkness. At race's end, Ryan Newman, driving for Penske Racing, would dominate the race until the end to win his first career NASCAR Winston Cup Series win and his only win of the season. To fill out the podium, Kurt Busch of Roush Racing and Tony Stewart of Joe Gibbs Racing would finish second and third, respectively.

Background 

New Hampshire International Speedway is a 1.058-mile (1.703 km) oval speedway located in Loudon, New Hampshire which has hosted NASCAR racing annually since the early 1990s, as well as an IndyCar weekend and the oldest motorcycle race in North America, the Loudon Classic. Nicknamed "The Magic Mile", the speedway is often converted into a 1.6-mile (2.6 km) road course, which includes much of the oval. The track was originally the site of Bryar Motorsports Park before being purchased and redeveloped by Bob Bahre. The track is currently one of eight major NASCAR tracks owned and operated by Speedway Motorsports.

Entry list 

 (R) denotes rookie driver.

Practice

First practice 
The first practice session was held on Friday, September 13, at 11:20 AM EST, and would last for 2 hours.

Second practice 
The second practice session was held on Saturday, September 14, at 9:30 AM EST, and would last for 45 minutes.

Third and final practice 
The third and final practice session, sometimes referred to as Happy Hour, was held on Saturday, September 14, at 11:15 AM EST, and would last for 45 minutes.

Qualifying 
Qualifying was held on Friday, September 13, at 3:05 PM EST. Each driver would have two laps to set a fastest time; the fastest of the two would count as their official qualifying lap. Positions 1-36 would be decided on time, while positions 37-43 would be based on provisionals. Six spots are awarded by the use of provisionals based on owner's points. The seventh is awarded to a past champion who has not otherwise qualified for the race. If no past champion needs the provisional, the next team in the owner points will be awarded a provisional.

Carl Long was the only driver to fail to qualify.

Full qualifying results

Race results

References 

2002 NASCAR Winston Cup Series
NASCAR races at New Hampshire Motor Speedway
September 2002 sports events in the United States
2002 in sports in New Hampshire